Ananias and his wife Sapphira were, according to the biblical New Testament in Acts of the Apostles chapter 5, members of the early Christian church in Jerusalem. The account records their sudden deaths after lying to the Holy Spirit about money.

Their story is rarely shown in art, but is the subject of one of the Raphael Cartoons, and a panel on the Brescia Casket, both illustrated here. It is also shown on a 1590s painting by Ambrosius Francken the Elder.

Story summary

Acts chapter  closes by stating that the first followers of Jesus did not consider their possessions to be their own but rather held in common, in order to use what they had on behalf of those in want. For example, Barnabas, a Levite from Cyprus, sold a plot of land and donated the proceeds to the apostles.

As told at the beginning of Acts chapter  Ananias and Sapphira, following Barnabas' example, also sold their land but secretly withheld a portion of the proceeds. Ananias presented his donation to Peter. Peter replied, "Why is it that Satan has so filled your heart that you have lied to the Holy Spirit?" Peter pointed out that Ananias was in control of the money and could give or keep it as he saw fit, but had withheld a portion of it.  Peter stated that Ananias had lied not to men, but to God. Because of his actions Ananias died on the spot and was carried out.  Everyone who heard about the incident feared the Lord.  Three hours after Ananias' death his wife arrived, unaware of what had happened. Peter asked her the price of the land that she and Ananias had sold, and she stated the same untruthful price that Ananias had given. She too, fell dead.

Patristic commentary
The fourth-century archbishop John Chrysostom alludes to and then dismisses the idea that Peter could be held responsible for the couple's death.

Modern scholarship
The morality of the incident has been the source of some commentary. Dunn (1996) describes it as "one of the most unnerving episodes in the whole of the New Testament." Many scholars have noted parallels with the story of Achan (Joshua 7), and Havelaar (1997) notes various parallel events in pagan literature, in particular one close parallel in an event recounted by Herodotus about a certain Glaucus who tried to tempt the gods at Delphi by lying about money he had kept dishonestly, and was subsequently deprived of descendants.

Darrell Bock concludes that the episode emphasises the seriousness of sin, as well as the graciousness of God who often defers judgment. The church is not composed of perfect people, but sins including pride and deceit will eventually be dealt with.

The Lutheran New Testament Professor Matthew L. Skinner claims the story is meant to be gallows humour.  He states that, "The story aims for gallows humor, but we read Acts in a different place today. Our familiarity with religiously sanctioned violence makes it difficult to laugh, even if we understand that this scene may not be offered as serious, definitive theology."

Marc Pernot, Calvinist pastor at L'Oratoire du Louvre, sees the story as a critique of the shortcomings of Peter and the early Church.  "When men want to impose unity, there are problems. …  Jesus never instituted a system requiring people to liquidate all their capital... This is compulsory morality...  Luke, the author of the book of Acts thus presents Peter and his first church rather critically. In my opinion it is not the only time, because if Peter seems to be the leader of the Church of Jerusalem in the days of Ananias and Sapphira, later in the book of Acts (Acts 15 and  Galatians 2:8) we see that he has lost the first place..."

P. M. Garner reads the story as subversive narrative showing Peter, complicit in the deaths of Ananias and Sapphira, showing immaturity in imaging the son of God.

According to the missionary and author Paris Reidhead, the passage is intended to illustrate two key points: the seriousness of lying to the Holy Spirit and the importance of keeping integrity in the believers’ fellowship with Christ, i.e., keeping the fellowship free of sin. More specifically on the second point, Reidhead commented that the introduction of sin would destroy the unity that the early believers had in the Holy Spirit, and would thus remove God's blessing on the body. Reidhead noted that God does not punish everyone who makes the same mistake as Ananias and Sapphira; nevertheless, the passage illustrates God's unambiguous attitude on this matter.

Though the passage is about the offering of money, Reidhead extended the implication to all services offered to God. There must not be any ulterior motives in an offering made to God, such as desiring material gain, fame, or praise of man for oneself.

Concerning the belief held by some, that Peter caused the death of the couple, Reidhead held the view that Peter simply anticipated God's action and relayed it to Ananias and Sapphira before God took the action.

References

External links 
 Acts 4 at WikiSource
 Acts 5 at WikiSource

Early Jewish Christians
Articles about multiple people in the Bible
Married couples
1st-century deaths
Targeted killing
Year of birth unknown
People in Acts of the Apostles
Women in the New Testament